Stanovishchevo is a rural locality (a village) in Pertsevskoye Rural Settlement, Gryazovetsky District, Vologda Oblast, Russia. The population was 35 as of 2002. There are 4 streets.

Geography 
Stanovishchevo is located 17 km north of Gryazovets (the district's administrative centre) by road. Dorozhny Krutets is the nearest rural locality.

References 

Rural localities in Gryazovetsky District